The 2006–07 season was Juventus F.C.'s 109th season in existence and first season in its history in Serie B following the 2006 Italian football scandal, leaving Internazionale as the only Italian club never to have been relegated. Juventus were docked nine points this season (repealed from the original 30-point deduction). Juventus finished the Serie B season in first place and were thus promoted back up to Serie A.

Following the enforced relegation, Juventus lost Fabio Cannavaro and Emerson to Real Madrid, Lilian Thuram and Gianluca Zambrotta to Barcelona, Adrian Mutu to Fiorentina, and Patrick Vieira and Zlatan Ibrahimović to Internazionale. The remainder of the squad did however stay including Alessandro Del Piero, Gianluigi Buffon, Giorgio Chiellini, Pavel Nedvěd, David Trezeguet, Marcelo Zalayeta, and Mauro Camoranesi, for the following 2006–07 Serie B.

Squad
Squad at end of season

Transfers

Winter

Events
In July 2006, former player Didier Deschamps was announced as the new manager following the resignation of Fabio Capello, who left for Spanish club Real Madrid.

The club made its Serie B debut on 9 September 2006, earning their first ever point in Serie B with a 1–1 draw away to Rimini. After that, Juventus won its next eight games, scoring 16 goals and conceding just one. The winning streak ended with a 1–1 draw at Napoli. In that game, goalkeeper Gianluigi Buffon's streak of not conceding a goal ended at 733 minutes. Against Albinoleffe, Buffon was shown the red card for the first time in his career and conceded a penalty, but a 10-man Juve team managed to draw the game. They were undefeated in Serie B until the team lost at Mantova on 14 January 2007.

On 15 December 2006, two Berretti (U-18) youth players Alessio Ferramosca, age 17, and Riccardo Neri, age 16, drowned in a pond at the club's training ground in Vinovo, apparently when trying to recover a football that had fallen into the ice-cold water. The Juventus vs Cesena (Serie B) game scheduled for that day was cancelled and postponed until January due to the tragedy.

On 19 May 2007, after a 5–1 away win at Arezzo on the 39th matchday, Juventus was mathematically promoted to Serie A. On Matchday 40, Juventus were then crowned Serie B champions following a 2–0 home win to Mantova On 26 May, it was confirmed that Deschamps had resigned as manager due to differences with the club hierarchy, especially director of football Alessio Secco. His assistant Giancarlo Corradini was appointed caretaker for the last two games. On 4 June, Claudio Ranieri was announced as the new manager on the club website as Corradini stepped down to take up another management job full-time.

Squad statistics
Sources:

Appearances and goals

|-
|colspan="10"|Players sold or loaned out during the January transfer window:

|}

Goalscorers
Last updated 10 June 2007

Competitions

Serie B

League table

Results by matchday 
Note: this table does not take point deductions, such as Juventus' 9-point one, into account.

Matches

Coppa Italia

References

Juventus F.C. seasons
Juventus